The National Democratic Party is a progressive political party in Nigeria which was founded on 23 July 2001.
At the last legislative elections, in 2023, the party won 0 out of 360 seats in the House of Representatives and no seats in the Senate.

Political parties in Nigeria
2001 establishments in Nigeria